UK Biobank is a large long-term biobank study in the United Kingdom (UK) which is investigating the respective contributions of genetic predisposition and environmental exposure (including nutrition, lifestyle, medications etc.) to the development of disease. It began in 2006.

Based in Stockport, Greater Manchester, it is incorporated as a limited company and registered charity in England and Wales, and registered as a charity in Scotland.

Design 
The study is following about 500,000 volunteers in the UK, enrolled at ages from 40 to 69.
Initial enrollment took place over four years from 2006, and the volunteers will be followed for at least 30 years thereafter.

Prospective participants were invited to visit an assessment centre,
at which they completed an automated questionnaire and were interviewed about lifestyle, medical history and nutritional habits; basic variables such weight, height, blood pressure etc. were measured; and blood and urine samples were taken. These samples were preserved so that it was possible to later extract DNA and measure other biologically important substances.  During the whole duration of the study it was intended that all disease events, drug prescriptions and deaths of the participants are recorded in a database, taking advantage of the centralized UK National Health Service.

During the initial physical examination, basic feedback was provided to the participant regarding their weight, height, BMI, blood pressure, lung vital capacity, bone density and intra-ocular pressure; however if any other medical problems were detected, neither the participant nor their physician would be notified. Problems detected later, such as genetic risk factors, were not conveyed to either participant or physician ("to ensure that volunteers are not penalised by insurance companies, for example, which may require customers to disclose the results of any genetic tests.").

From 2012, researchers were able to apply to use the database (though they are not given access
to the volunteers, who will remain strictly anonymous).
A typical study using the database might compare a sample of participants who developed a particular disease, such as cancer, heart disease, diabetes or Alzheimer's disease, with a sample of those that did not, in an attempt to measure the
benefits, risk contribution and interaction of specific genes, lifestyles, and medications.

In 2017 researchers were able to access the database including genetic information. By 2017 Biobank participants had approximately 1.3 million hospitalisations, 40,000 cancer incidents with 14,000 of them having died.

Development 

An incremental approach was adopted to developing the study procedures and technology, using systems designed and developed by the Clinical Trial Service Unit.  This consisted of a series of pilot studies of increasing complexity and sophistication with interludes for assessment of results and additional scientific input.  In-house trials were conducted during 2005, and a fully integrated clinic was run at Altrincham, Greater Manchester throughout Spring 2006 where 3,800 individuals were assessed.  On August 22, 2006, it was announced that the main programme would recruit men and women aged between 40 and 69 based from up to 35 regional centres, however recruitment proved more efficient than hoped and only 22 centres had been opened when the recruitment target of 500,000 was reached in 2010.

Initial information collected 

The study was initially launched with a visit consisting of the following:
 A paperless consent process
 A touchscreen questionnaire on lifestyle and general health
 Touchscreen tests of memory
 An interview with a nurse on detailed medical history
 Measurement of blood pressure
 Measurement of sitting and standing heights
 Measurement of weight
 Body composition measurement using impedance
 Measurement of grip-strength
 Breath spirometry
 Ultrasound bone densitometry of the heel
 Collection of blood and urine samples

Once the visit-based assessment method was proven, the range of investigations was extended to include:
 Test of hearing discrimination
 Measurement of arterial pulse-wave velocity
 Measurement of visual acuity
 Measurement of intra-ocular pressure
 Lens refractometry
 Fundus image of retina
 Optical coherence tomography scan of retina
 Electrocardiogram during exercise
 Collection of saliva sample
 Dietary assessment

Ethics and governance 

The UK Biobank project operates within the terms of an Ethics and Governance Framework. The Framework describes a series of standards to which UK Biobank will operate during the creation, maintenance and use of the resource and it elaborates on the commitments that are involved to those participating in the project, researchers and the public more broadly. The independent UK Biobank Ethics and Governance Council provides advice to the project and monitors its conformity with the Framework. The Council also advises more generally on the interests of research participants and the general public in relation to the project.

The UK Biobank Board is accountable to the members of the company (the Medical Research Council and The Wellcome Trust) and acts as company directors and as charity trustees. It is chaired by Lord Kakkar, who succeeded Sir Michael Rawlins in January 2020.

Recruitment 

Following the initial pilot stage in the 2005-6 period, the main study began in April 2007 and by the end of that year 50,000 people had taken part.
Recruitment reached 100,000 in April 2008, 200,000 in October 2008, 300,000 in May 2009, 400,000 in November 2009 and passed the 500,000 target in July 2010. Participant enrollment was declared complete in August 2010.  The volunteers were largely healthy, wealthy and white European. Rather than recruiting more participants into the biobank, the organisation is helping other institutions establish and run similar initiatives.

Usage 

The UK Biobank dataset was opened to applications from researchers in March 2012.
The resource is available to scientists from the UK and outside, whether they work in the public or private sector, for industry, academia or a charity, subject to verification that the research is health-related and in the public interest. Researchers are required to publish their results in an open source publication site or in an academic journal and return their findings to the UK Biobank.
By April 2017 4,600 researchers had registered to use the resource, over 880 applications had been submitted and 430 research projects were completed or underway. 130 peer-reviewed articles based on the UK Biobank data had been published by January 2017.

Extensions 

Since the completion of recruitment several new types of data have been added:
 During 2011-12 participants who supplied an email address were asked to assist by completing web-based dietary questionnaires, with the aim of combining a series of daily 'snapshots' to form a picture of overall nutrition.  176,012 of the participants responded at least once and 27,535 completed four questionnaires over a 16-month period.
 During 2012–13 25,000 participants at the Stockport centre were asked to attend the assessment centre to repeat the initial measurements. It was intended to repeat these assessments every few years.
 In 2013 to 2015, Axivity AX3 tri-axial wrist physical activity monitors were distributed to 100,000 participants, which recorded week-long triaxial acceleration at 100 Hz. This data was centrally processed, and listed on the Data Showcase.
 In 2014 and 2015 120,000 participants completed a questionnaire on cognitive functions. Four of the tests were repeats of the initial assessment and two tests (symbol digit substitution and trail making) were new.
 In 2015 and 2016, 117,500 participants completed questionnaires on occupational history and related medical information.
 In 2016 and 2017 137,400 participants completed questionnaires on mental health events including subjective well-being estimates, psychotic experiences, self-harm behaviours, traumatic events and cannabis and alcohol use.
 A genomic assay of 820,967 SNPs was conducted on the participants blood samples. Data from an initial 150,000 participants were released in 2015, the remainder in July 2017, and the first results in October 2018.
 Information from UK registries of death (from 2006) and cancer (Scotland from 1957, England and Wales from 1995) were linked to the main Biobank dataset on an ongoing basis.
 Data from NHS hospital inpatient records (England from 1996, Scotland from 1997 and Wales from 1998) were linked to the main dataset on an ongoing basis.
 In 2019 exome sequence data from 50,000 persons was released, with 200,000 being available by 2020.
 In 2020 20,000 volunteers agreed to collect and send a monthly blood sample for analysis of SARS-CoV-2 antibodies. They included existing Biobank participants and their children and adult grandchildren living in separate households.
 In 2021 NMR metabolomic data on 125,000 persons was released.
 In June 2021 a subset of volunteers who had acknowledged that they had already received at least their first Covid-19 vaccine dose, were asked to participate in a study to determine if their Covid-19 antibodies were as a result of their vaccination or from a prior infection.

Ongoing developments 

In 2018 a number of projects were underway to generate additional data:
 A set of additional assays on the blood and urinary samples were being conducted in 2016 and 2017 with blood results expected to be released in Q4/2018.
 A new type of assessment centre opened in 2014 to collect imaging data. The visits extended the initial dataset to include magnetic resonance imaging (MRI) scans of brain heart and abdomen, as well as neck-to-knee volumetric MRI scans, whole body dual-energy X-ray absorptiometry (DXA) scan of bones and joints, ultrasound measurements of the carotid arteries and resting 12-lead electrocardiogram (ECG). Initial data on 4,000 participants was released at the end of 2015 and by mid-2018 over 25,000 participants had been scanned. It is planned to scan 100,000 participants by 2022, and to do additional repeat scans on 10,000 of these 2–3 years later.
 A subset of 2500 participants are being asked to repeat the Activity Study at quarterly intervals for a year to gauge the size of seasonal effects.

Future plans 

In 2018 there were several plans, either provisional or underway, for enhancing the resource:
 Primary care data (such as referrals, diagnoses and prescriptions) were planned to be made available in 2018–2019.
 Linking data from NHS hospital outpatient records and GP to the main dataset were being investigated in 2018.
 Linkages to disease-specific registries and screening programs were also being investigated in 2018.
 Exome sequencing is underway with the first batch of 50,000 sequences due to be released in mid-2019.
 Full genome sequencing was being investigated with a pilot project underway.

Opinion 

The project has been generally praised for its ambitious scope and unique potential. A scientific review panel concluded, the "UK Biobank has the potential, in ways that are not currently available elsewhere, to support a wide range of research". Colin Blakemore, chief executive of the MRC, predicted it "will provide scientists with extraordinary information" and "grow into a unique resource for future generations."

There was some early criticism, however. GeneWatch UK, a pressure group that claims to promote the responsible use of genetic information, asserted that the complexity of the programme could result in the finding of "false links between genes and disease", and expressed concern that the genetic information from patients could be patented for commercial purposes. Biobank's chief executive described such a risk as "extremely low, if it exists at all."

The method of recruiting participants was also initially controversial. Participants were sent letters of invitation based on names, addresses, and dates of birth provided by the NHS to the UK Biobank organisers. Although compliant with UK data protection law, some people objected to the NHS passing on such data to third parties without explicit consent, and also had concerns about the data security in such a large project.

Some literature has raised concerns that the UK Biobank is not representative of the diversity of the UK population or is not applicable to diverse populations.

Funding 
The UK Biobank is funded by the UK Department of Health, the Medical Research Council, the Scottish Executive, and the Wellcome Trust medical research charity. The cost of the initial participant recruitment and assessment phase was 62 million GBP.

Related projects 
EPIC (European Prospective Investigation into Cancer and Nutrition) is a similar study that was started in 1992 and involves 520,000 men and women mostly between 35 and 70 years old from ten European countries. Participants are recontacted every three to five years. It is specifically designed to study the respective roles of diet and genes in the development of cancer.

In 1996, Icelandic neurologist Kári Stefánsson founded a private company deCODE genetics, to assemble genealogical, genomic and health data from across the population of Iceland – then about 270,000 people. The purpose was to mine this data, under encrypted identifiers generated by the country's Data Protection Authority, to identify genetic variations associated with diseases and to use that information to develop new drugs. As of 2018, more than 160,000 people had contributed DNA and detailed health information to the company's research into the inherited components of common and rare diseases. deCODE has published hundreds of discoveries in cardiovascular and autoimmune diseases, Alzheimer's and other central nervous system diseases, many types of cancer, and dozens of other conditions and traits. Now an independent subsidiary of Amgen, deCODE has provided novel targets now in clinical development and provides human genetics validation across a range of therapeutic areas. In 2018, Stefansson made good on a promise that the company would launch a website that enables Icelanders to request the analysis of their sequence data to determine whether they carry a SNP in the BRCA2 gene that has been linked in Icelanders to significantly increased risk of breast and prostate cancer. More than 10% of the population has used this portal, and the country's national health system has increased clinical testing, counseling and treatment to take advantage of this information for public health.

The Estonian Genome Project was started in 2000 with the aim of improving public health in the country.  Initially it was hoped to obtain biological samples and health data from 70% of the 1.4 million population of Estonia.  The aims of the project were downsized however over the years. By the end of 2019 Estonian Genome Project had recruited 200 000 gene donors i.e. 20% of the adult population.

The China Kadoorie Biobank study collected questionnaire and physical data and blood samples on 510,000 men and women aged between 30 and 79 from 10 regions in China between 2004–2008 with the aim of investigating chronic diseases (e.g. heart attack, stroke, diabetes, and cancer). Participants have been linked to mortality registers and nationwide health systems and a sub-group of 25,000 are retested every few years.

In 2006, a similar project by the U.S. National Human Genome Research Institute known as "The American project" was proposed. In 2015 the US National Institutes of Health launched the "Precision Medicine Initiative" which was renamed "All of Us" in 2016. This project had enrolled over 10,000 people by January 2018 in a pilot phase with an aim to sign up one million participants by 2022. As of February 2021 the program has enrolled 369,000 participants with 235,000 Electronic Health Records and 280,000 biosamples. 

The Lifelines cohort study was started in 2006 and collects data and samples on 167,000 children, adults and elderly from the Northern part of the Netherlands. The aim of Lifelines is to constitute a biobank that provides high-quality data and samples by following all participants over a period of at least 30 years. The collected data offer excellent opportunities for studies worldwide unraveling the etiology of multifactorial diseases focusing on multifactor risk factors. This will help to move forward to more personalised health care and prevention and to answer the question why some people grow old in good health while others contract diseases.

The Finngen project was launched in 2018 with the aim of collecting biological samples from 500,000 participants in Finland over six years with the aim of improving health through genetic research.

East London Genes & Health is a genomic research study of 100,000 people of Bangladeshi and Pakistani origin carried out by Queen Mary University of London.

See also 
 All of Us (initiative)
 Framingham Heart Study
 Baseline Study

References

External links 
 

Biobank organizations
Charities based in Greater Manchester
Genetics databases
Genetics in the United Kingdom
Organisations based in Stockport
Science and technology in Greater Manchester
Wellcome Trust
2007 establishments in the United Kingdom
Medical and health organisations based in England